Morey Doner (born March 25, 1994) is a Canadian professional soccer player for Monterey Bay FC in USL Championship.

Club career

Early career
In 2014, Doner played for Durham United FC in League1 Ontario. Afterwards, he returned to his hometown of Collingwood, Ontario, a town of just 21,000 people, where he played in recreational men's leagues. In 2016, he went to Brazil, where he had a pay-to-play opportunity in Brazil in the Campeonato Paulista Série A3, the lowest professional state league in São Paulo, which cost him $1500 per month. He was on a trial, but was not able to sign or play, due to not being able to obtain a visa.

Palm Beach Suns
After his stint in Brazil, Doner joined American USL Premier Development League side Palm Beach Suns FC, making seven appearances that season.

Aurora FC
Late in the 2016 season, Doner joined League1 Ontario side Aurora FC after a trial, making one appearance at the end of 2016 and then making five appearances the following season. 2018 proved to be a breakout year for Doner, as he was named team captain, played every minute of every game for Aurora, totalling sixteen appearances and three goals. That season, he was also named to the league All-Star Team at the end of the season. While playing in Aurora, he continued to live in his hometown of Collingwood, making a two-hour commute for every practice and home match. While he had opportunities to join other teams in 2018 (including a deal to be potentially the first League1 Ontario player to fetch a transfer fee), Doner remained with Aurora, which led to former coach Jim Brennan coming to scout him and inviting him to attend a York9 FC combine.

York9

On February 8, 2019, Doner signed his first professional contract with Canadian Premier League side York9, rejoining his former coach at Aurora, Jim Brennan. On May 25, 2019, he made his league debut as a starter in York's inaugural league home match against Forge FC. Doner scored his first goal for York9 against Valour FC on July 1. On October 24, Doner announced on Twitter he would remain with York9 for the 2020 season. On April 23, 2020, York9 announced a contract extension that would keep Doner with the Nine Stripes through the 2021 CPL season. However, despite the earlier contract extension, in November 2020, York9 announced Doner and the club had mutually agreed to part ways.

HFX Wanderers
On January 6, 2021, Doner signed with HFX Wanderers to a one-year contract, with an option for 2022. Doner had a good individual 2021 season, contributing with three assists (tied for the team lead), and making his presence felt by creating many chances, using his speed to make runs down the flanks, led the team in duels won, and was also the Wanderers most fouled player. However, the Wanderers just missed out on qualifying for the playoffs, and Doner did not play in the deciding final game. After the season ended, he announced that he would not be returning to the club.

Monterey Bay FC
In February 2022, he signed with Monterey Bay FC in the USL Championship. Doner scored his first goal for Monterey Bay on June 15, 2022, during a 3–2 loss to LA Galaxy II. After playing in every match in his first season, he signed a two year extension through the 2024 season.

Club statistics

Honours
Individual
League1 Ontario All-Star: 2018

References

External links

 

1994 births
Living people
Association football fullbacks
Canadian soccer players
Soccer people from Ontario
Sportspeople from Collingwood, Ontario
Canadian expatriate soccer players
Expatriate soccer players in the United States
Canadian expatriate sportspeople in the United States
York United FC players
HFX Wanderers FC players
USL League Two players
League1 Ontario players
Canadian Premier League players
Monterey Bay FC players
Aurora FC (Canada) players